Carex hyalinolepis is a tussock-forming species of perennial sedge in the family Cyperaceae. It is native to southern parts of North America from Ontario in the north to Texas in the south.

See also
List of Carex species

References

hyalinolepis
Plants described in 1855
Taxa named by Ernst Gottlieb von Steudel
Flora of Ontario
Flora of Texas
Flora of Virginia
Flora of Alabama
Flora of Arkansas
Flora of Florida
Flora of Georgia (U.S. state)
Flora of Illinois
Flora of Indiana
Flora of Iowa
Flora of Kansas
Flora of Kentucky
Flora of Louisiana
Flora of Maryland
Flora of Michigan
Flora of Mississippi
Flora of Missouri
Flora of Nebraska
Flora of North Carolina
Flora of Ohio
Flora of Oklahoma
Flora of South Carolina
Flora of Pennsylvania
Flora of Tennessee